Tryin' To Start Out Clean was the debut album released by Canadian singer-songwriter  Willie P. Bennett and was released as an LP album by his own label, Woodshed Records in 1975 (WS-004).  The album was recorded and mixed at Thunder Sound, Toronto, January–February, 1975, after Bennett had been playing for some time with his bluegrass group, the Bone China Band. He promoted the songs from the album during his solo performances.

The album contains one of Bennett's best-known songs, "Music In Your Eyes", which was performed live and recorded, separately, by Canadian folk icons Stan Rogers and his brother Garnet Rogers, amongst others.  "White Line" was first released as a single in 1969. In 2014, Canadian musician, Peter Thompson, released his album Music in Your Eyes which features Thompson's cover as the opening track.

Bennett re-released the album on compact disc in 2001. The album was digitally remastered by Paul Reiemens at Grant Avenue Studios in Hamilton, Ontario and released on Bennett's independent label, Bnatural Music.  In 2003 it was re-released by Japanese label Air Mail Archive (AIRAC-1038), as part of their "Canadian Singer Songwriters Series Vol. 2", in an LP-style slipcase.  However, this edition was mastered from a vinyl LP.

Track listing
Side one

 "Driftin' Snow" - 2:42
 "White Line" - 4:26
 "Me and Molly" - 3:34
 "Don't Blame Your Blues on Me" - 2:04
 "Country Squall" - 1:15
 "In a Prayer" - 3:46

Side two

 "My Pie" - 2:58
 "Music in your Eyes" - 5:28
 "Willie's Diamond Joe" - 3:41
 "Down to the Water" - 4:20
 "Tryin' to Start out Clean" - 3:40
 "Driftin' Snow (Reprise) / Sault Creek III" - 1:50

All words and music by Willie P. Bennett, C&R 2001 Bnatural Music

Personnel
 Willie P. Bennett – vocals, guitar
 Dennis Pendrith - bass
 Bill Usher - drums, percussion
 Chris Whiteley - harmonica, trumpet
 Ken Whiteley - piano, organ, lead guitar (on "Country Squall"), banjo (on "Reprise")
 Ron Dann - pedal steel
 Zeke Mazurek - fiddle
 Dave Essig - mandolin, rhythm guitar (on "Music In Your Eyes")
 Willie P. Bennett, Snarlin' Dave Quinn, Chris Whiteley, Ken Whiteley - backing vocals
Technical
 Produced by Dave Essig
 Engineered by Phil Sheridan
 Recorded and mixed at Thunder Sound, Toronto, January–February 1975

References

1975 debut albums
Willie P. Bennett albums